Reduced vertical separation minimum (RVSM) is the reduction, from 2,000 feet to 1,000 feet, of the standard vertical separation required between aircraft flying between flight level 290 (29,000 ft) and flight level 410 (41,000 ft). Expressed in the International System of Units (SI), it is the reduction, from 600 m to 300 m, of required vertical separation of aircraft between altitudes 8,850  and 12,500 m. This reduction in vertical separation minimum therefore increases the number of aircraft that can fly in a particular volume of controlled airspace.

Historical background
In 1958 the standard vertical separation of aircraft in controlled airspace was set at 1,000 feet from ground level or sea level to flight level 290, and at 2,000 feet above flight level 290. The larger minimum separations at higher altitudes was necessary because the accuracy of altimeters, used to determine altitude by measuring air pressure, decreases with height. Efforts to reduce this separation above flight level 290 began almost immediately, but doing so without compromising safety required improvements in altimeters and other equipment, due in part to inherent difficulties in accurately determining and maintaining aircraft altitudes and, therefore, the actual vertical distance between aircraft. It was not until the 1990s that air data computers (ADCs), altimeters, and autopilot systems became sufficiently accurate to safely reduce the vertical separation minimum.

Implementation
Between 1997 and 2005 RVSM was implemented in all of Europe, North Africa, Southeast Asia and North America, South America, and over the North Atlantic, South Atlantic, and Pacific Oceans. The North Atlantic implemented initially in March 1997 at flight levels 330 through 370. The entire western hemisphere implemented RVSM FL290–FL410 on January 20, 2005. Africa implemented it on September 25, 2008.

The People's Republic of China implemented metric RVSM on 21 November 2007. But the Hong Kong FIR continued to use flight levels in feet.

The Russian Federation implemented RVSM and flight levels in feet on November 17, 2011. However, in some FIRs, meters are still in use below transition level.

Requirements
Only aircraft with specially certified altimeters and autopilots may fly in RVSM airspace, otherwise the aircraft must fly lower or higher than the airspace, or seek special exemption from the requirements. Additionally, aircraft operators (airlines or corporate operators) must receive specific approval from the aircraft's state of registry to conduct operations in RVSM airspace.  Non RVSM approved aircraft may transit through RVSM airspace provided they are given continuous climb/descent throughout the designated airspace, and 2,000 ft vertical separation is provided at all times between the non-RVSM flight, and all others for the duration of the climb/descent.

"State aircraft", which includes aircraft used in military, customs and police service, are exempted from the requirement to be RVSM approved. Participating states have been requested, however, to adapt their state aircraft for RVSM approval, to the extent possible, and especially those aircraft used for general air traffic (GAT).

Equipment Requirements:
 2 Independent Altitude Measuring Systems
 SSR (secondary surveillance radar) Altitude Reporting Transponder
 Altitude Alert System
 Autopilot
 Flight Crew Approved Training Program / OpSpecs Approval

See also
 Acronyms and abbreviations in avionics
 Aviation safety
 Flight level
 List of aviation, aerospace and aeronautical abbreviations
 North Atlantic Tracks
 Strategic lateral offset procedure
 Traffic collision avoidance system (TCAS)

References

Further reading
 Authorization of Aircraft and Operators for Flight in Reduced Vertical Separation Minimum (RVSM) Airspace

External links
Altimetry System Error (ASE) and its effects on operations in RVSM airspace
FAA article promoting the new rule
Friendlier Skies – Washington Times
RVSM on Skybrary
Use of Trailing Cones for RVSM Certification

Air traffic control
1997 introductions
Altitudes in aviation